Andrei Olegovich Timofeyev (born 8 February 1996) is a Russian football player who plays as a goalkeeper.

Club career
He made his debut in the Russian Premier League for FC Ural Yekaterinburg on 29 April 2017 in a game against FC Terek Grozny.

References

External links
 

1996 births
People from Sverdlovsk Oblast
Living people
Russian footballers
FC Ural Yekaterinburg players
Russian Premier League players
Association football goalkeepers
Sportspeople from Sverdlovsk Oblast